The Monégasque Revolution was a series of confrontations by the subjects of Monaco against their ruler, Prince Albert I. It led to the end of absolute monarchy with the promulgation of the Constitution of Monaco the following year.

Popular demands
The subjects had several grievances against the prince.  There was severe unemployment as the country lacked farmlands or factories and the gaming establishment banned the hiring of the prince's subjects.  Their national pride was hampered by a poor reputation as "the moral cesspool of Europe".  In addition, the prince spent his money in France rather than at home.  They demanded a constitution and a parliament with the threat of overthrowing the monarchy and establishing a republic should the prince fail to comply.  Other demands included the termination of Camille Blanc and Roland Bonaparte's monopoly over the gaming establishment, the removal of French citizens from state offices, and the separation of the prince's finances from the state's.

In early March 1910, a delegation made up of Suffren Peymond, Théodore Gastaud, André Marsan and Charles Bellando de Castro arrived to deliver an ultimatum to the prince. Later that month, the prince acquiesced to their demands. For the rest of the year, there were protests against French domination of Monaco's government and economy. The Prince's Palace was also stormed by an angry mob who looted the palace.
The prince escaped with the help of the Compagnie des Carabiniers du Prince, and stayed in France until the riots died down. Soldiers of the Compagnie did try to defend the palace but ultimately failed after the day-long riot.

Constitution

On 5 January 1911, a new constitution was promulgated. Nevertheless, Prince Albert I still wielded considerable power and suspended the constitution during World War I. After Prince Albert I's death in 1922, The New York Times published a 1921 interview with him on the process and his views on the need for the 1911 revolution.

See also

 Albert I, Prince of Monaco#Later life
 Camille Blanc#Persona non grata in Monaco

References

Conflicts in 1910
History of Monaco
20th-century revolutions
Wars involving Monaco
Republicanism in Monaco
1910 in Monaco